Abbeystrewry Church is an Anglican church located in Skibbereen, County Cork, Ireland. It was completed in 1890. It is part of Abbeystrewry Union of Parishes in the Diocese of Cork, Cloyne, and Ross.

History 
Abbeystrewry Church is the second church on its site. The first church was built in 1827 at a cost of IR£1,200 and was funded in part by a loan from the Board of First Fruits. The new church, completed in 1890, incorporated elements of this original structure and used it as transepts, while also preserving the tower.

Rev John Ardis currently serves as the rector.

Architecture 
The church was designed by William Henry Hill, and features a gable-fronted elevation. A ring of six bells was installed in 2002.

References

Notes

Sources 

Architecture in Ireland
Churches in the Diocese of Cork, Cloyne and Ross
19th-century Church of Ireland church buildings